Anna Maria Bisi (1938–1988), known as A. M. Bisi, was an Italian archaeologist and academic, specialising in the Phoenicians and Punics.

Life
Bisi had a single minded career. She was supported by S.Moscati when she obtained her doctorate and after she published "Il
grifone: dalle origini orientali al VI secolo a.C.” in 1965 and two years later “Le
Stele puniche,” again in "Studi Semitici" but this time on Punic archaeology. Bisi was made Professor of Punic Antiquities at the Sapienza University of Rome in 1969, and Professor of the Archaeology of the Ancient Near East at the University of Urbino in 1971. Her research focused on artisanal handicrafts and iconography, through which she studied the spread of Phoenician culture and cultural relations throughout the Mediterranean.

Selected works

References

1938 births
1988 deaths
Italian archaeologists
Italian women archaeologists
Archaeologists of the Near East
20th-century archaeologists
Academic staff of the University of Urbino
Academic staff of the Sapienza University of Rome
20th-century Italian women writers
Phoenician-punic archaeologists